The Samuel Davis House is a historic farmhouse located near the cities of Columbus and Dublin in Norwich Township, Franklin County, Ohio, United States.  One of the county's older buildings, it was home to a pioneer settler, and it has been named a historic site.

Samuel Davis was born in Litchfield, Connecticut in 1763, but after a time of apprenticeship to a silversmith, he joined the Continental Army and fought in the American Revolution.  Following the end of the war, he travelled west to Kentucky County, Virginia to trade silver gadgets with the Indians.  Here he met numerous frontiersmen of renown, including Daniel Boone, Nathaniel Massie, and Simon Kenton.  After a period of time serving as a scout for a military group called Mason County Spy Company (assembled under Simon Kenton and General Scott, he found the present property and bought it on March 12, 1814, from a Highland County resident, and he built his house here in the following year.

Davis' house is a simple rectangular building constructed of simple stonework. Little craftsmanship was expended on the house; the only dressed stone in the walls, for example, is found on the quoins. Built in the Federal style, it is the oldest stone house still standing in Franklin County. In 1974, the Davis House was listed on the National Register of Historic Places, qualifying because of its historically significant architecture; it is one of numerous National Register-listed properties located along Dublin Road in and south of the city of Dublin.

References

Houses completed in 1816
Federal architecture in Ohio
Houses in Franklin County, Ohio
National Register of Historic Places in Franklin County, Ohio
Houses on the National Register of Historic Places in Ohio
Stone houses in Ohio
1816 establishments in Ohio